Ryves is a surname, and may refer to:

 Bruno Ryves (1596–1677), English royalist churchman
 Elizabeth Ryves (1750–1797), Irish author
 George Ryves, English academic
 Lavinia Ryves (1797–1871), British claimant
 P.M. Ryves, English astronomer who discovered the Ryves Comet
 Richard Ryves (1643-1693), Irish judge
 Thomas Ryves (c.1583-1652), English civil lawyer
 William Ryves (c.1570-1648), English lawyer

See also
Ryves Holt (1696–1763), Chief Justice of the Delaware Supreme Court